Gopal Rai (Nepali: गोपाल राई ) was a political leader of the Nepali Congress. He was state minister for Forest and Soil Conservation of Nepal. He became active in politics while studying bachelor's degree in Tri Chandra College against Panchayat System. He was captured while planning to attack by force in Okhaldhunga. His many friends were killed and he was put in jail.

Early life
Gopal Rai was born and raised in Okhaldhunga.

Death
He died in a MI-17 chopper accident at Ghunsa, Taplejung in Nepal during World Wide Fund for Nature program with other 23 passengers including his wife Mina Rai on 23 September 2006.

References

External links
Kinshipcircle.org
Wwfnepal.org

2006 deaths
People from Okhaldhunga
Nepali Congress politicians from Koshi Province
Victims of aviation accidents or incidents in Nepal
1957 births
Tri-Chandra College alumni
Nepal MPs 1999–2002